Chaminda Fernando (born 31 October 1969) is a Sri Lankan former cricketer. He played 51 first-class matches for Sinhalese Sports Club between 1988 and 1997. He was also part of Sri Lanka's squad for the 1988 Youth Cricket World Cup.

References

External links
 

1969 births
Living people
Sri Lankan cricketers
Sinhalese Sports Club cricketers
Cricketers from Colombo